Malcolm Howard (born February 7, 1983) is a Canadian rower. He was born in Victoria, British Columbia and graduated from Brentwood College School (Mill Bay, British Columbia) in 2001. While at Brentwood he joined Canada's junior national team.

As part of the national team Howard won three World Rowing Championships medals including a silver in 2004 in the men's coxed fours, and a gold in 2007 in the men's eights.

He won a gold medal at the 2008 Summer Olympics in the men's eights with Andrew Byrnes, Kyle Hamilton, Adam Kreek, Kevin Light, Ben Rutledge, Dominic Sieterle, Jake Wetzel and cox Brian Price. The crew was later named to Canada's Sports Hall of Fame.

At the 2012 Summer Olympics he won a silver medal in the men's eight. His teammates included Andrew Byrnes and Brian Price from the 2008 gold medal-winning crew. The other six were Gabriel Bergen, Jeremiah Brown, Will Crothers, Douglas Csima, Robert Gibson and Conlin McCabe.

Howard attended Harvard, never losing a race in three years of rowing for the university. He is pursuing a career in anesthesia at esteemed London Health Sciences Center, under the tutelage of Dr. Sonny Cheng. While studying for a master's degree in clinical medicine at Oxford's Oriel College he was in the stroke seat for the victorious Oxford crew in the 2013 Boat Race. He was the third Canadian to stroke a Boat Race crew, joining Kip McDaniel for Cambridge (2006) and Mike Evans for Oxford (1984). In 2014, he served as president of the Oxford University Boat Club and, rowing in the 5 seat, rowed in the Boat Race's winning eight for the second year in a row. Earlier in the Boat Race week it had been announced that Howard's 2008 Olympic champion men's eight crew was named to Canada's Sports Hall of Fame.

Howard has also rowed in pairs and single sculls. His wife Erika is a former world-class rhythmic gymnast.

References

External links
 Profile at Rowing Canada

1983 births
Living people
Canadian male rowers
Olympic gold medalists for Canada
Olympic rowers of Canada
Rowers at the 2008 Summer Olympics
Rowers at the 2012 Summer Olympics
Rowers from Victoria, British Columbia
Olympic medalists in rowing
Olympic silver medalists for Canada
Medalists at the 2012 Summer Olympics
Medalists at the 2008 Summer Olympics
Oxford University Boat Club rowers
Alumni of Oriel College, Oxford
Harvard University alumni
World Rowing Championships medalists for Canada
Harvard Crimson rowers